Pampadromaeus is an extinct genus of basal sauropodomorph dinosaurs known from the Late Triassic (Carnian) Santa Maria Formation of the Paraná Basin in Rio Grande do Sul, southern Brazil.

Discovery 
Pampadromaeus is known only from the holotype specimen ULBRA-PVT016, a disarticulated, partial but well preserved skeleton from a single individual which includes most of the skull bones and the lower jaws; dorsal, sacral and caudal vertebrae; elements of the shoulder girdle and the forelimbs, an ilium and elements of the hindlimbs. It was collected in the upper Hyperodapedon biozone from the Alemoa Member of the Santa Maria Formation (Rosário do Sul Group) in the "Janner" (also known as "Várzea do Agudo") locality, geopark of Paleorrota, dating to the Carnian faunal stage of the early Late Triassic, about 230–228 million years ago. A U-Pb (uranium decay) dating found that the Santa Maria Formation dated around 233.23 million years ago, putting it 1.5 million years older than the Ischigualasto Formation, and making the two formations approximately equal as the earliest dinosaur localities.

Description 

Pampadromaeus was a small bipedal animal. It shows a mosaic of basal and derived traits. It differs from other sauropodomorphs by a combination of characters. Some of these are shared with  members of the  Theropoda: the premaxilla is pointed downwards forming a subnarial gap with the maxilla and the anterior-most teeth are unserrated; in the location where with theropods the fenestra promaxillaris is positioned, a small depression is present. Basal traits consist of a large skull, a short thighbone, the possession of just two sacral vertebrae and the presence of fifteen teeth in the pterygoid.

There were four teeth in the premaxilla and about twenty in both the maxilla and the lower jaw for a total of eighty-eight. The teeth were large, elongated, lanceolate, slightly recurved, sharply pointed and coarsely serrated. The lower leg was much longer than the thighbone, indicating a cursorial lifestyle.

Etymology 
Pampadromaeus was first named by Sergio F. Cabreira, Cesar L. Schultz, Jonathas S. Bittencourt, Marina B. Soares, Daniel C. Fortier, Lúcio R. Silva and Max C. Langer in 2011 and the type species is Pampadromaeus barberenai. The generic name is derived from Quechua pampa, "plain", in reference to the present landscape of the site, and Greek δρομεύς, dromeus, "runner", referring to the cursorial habits; the Latinised spelling variant dromaeus is used. The specific name honours the Brazilian paleontologist Mário Costa Barberena.

Phylogeny 
Pampadromaeus was found to be a basal sauropodomorph in four different cladistic analyses. The describers emphasized however, that this position was not strongly supported, showing the difficulties of determining the affinities of such early forms with the basal Dinosauromorpha, Saurischia, Sauropodomorpha and Theropoda.

References

Bibliography 
 
 
 

Sauropodomorphs
Prehistoric tetrapod genera
Carnian genera
Late Triassic dinosaurs of South America
Triassic Brazil
Fossils of Brazil
Santa Maria Formation
Fossil taxa described in 2011
Paraná Basin